Ioannis Takouridis (born 24 May 1988) is a Greek professional volleyball player, member of the Greece men's national volleyball team. On club level he plays for PAOK.

References

External links
 profile at FIVB.org
 profile at greekvolley.gr
 

1988 births
Living people
Greek men's volleyball players
Olympiacos S.C. players
Place of birth missing (living people)
PAOK V.C. players
Competitors at the 2018 Mediterranean Games
Mediterranean Games bronze medalists for Greece
Mediterranean Games medalists in volleyball
Volleyball players from Thessaloniki